During the 1990–91 English football season, Everton F.C. competed in the Football League First Division. They finished 9th in the table, advanced to the 6th round of the FA Cup and were the runners-up in the Full Members' Cup, losing to Crystal Palace in the final at Wembley.

Final League table

Results
Everton's score comes first

Legend

Football League First Division

FA Cup

League Cup

Full Members' Cup

Squad

References

Everton F.C. seasons
Everton
Everton F.C. season